Courts of South Dakota include:
State courts of South Dakota
South Dakota Supreme Court
South Dakota Circuit Courts (7 circuits)
South Dakota Magistrate Courts

Federal courts located in South Dakota
United States District Court for the District of South Dakota

References

External links
National Center for State Courts – directory of state court websites.

Government of South Dakota
Courts in the United States